Robert Thomas (28 September 1927 in Gap, Hautes-Alpes – 3 January 1989) was a French writer, actor and film director.

As a writer, almost from the beginning, he was fascinated by a curious genre that he helped invent: the comédie policière or comedy thriller, of which Eight Women is an example. In 1960, Thomas had a hit with Trap for a Lonely Man, a humorous murder mystery which was an overnight success in Paris. Alfred Hitchcock bought the rights and the play established Thomas as a writer of psychological crime dramas with a distinctively Gallic comic twist. The following year the second outing of Eight Women was far more successful as it won the Hachette Prix du Quai des Orfevres for Best Play in 1961.

Thomas was a prolific actor, playwright and movie director. If he is best known for Eight Women it is probably because it was adapted into a movie musical by François Ozon in 2002 with a star-studded line-up that included Catherine Deneuve, Fanny Ardant and Emmanuelle Béart. Thomas’s plays were never fashionable and he was often dismissed by French critics but he was a popular dramatist. By the time he was 18, he claimed he had read every play published in French since 1900.

Thomas died in 1989 in Paris.

References

External links
 
A Uk version of Eight Women was shown at Southwark Playhouse from 9 April 2011

1927 births
1989 deaths
People from Gap, Hautes-Alpes
20th-century French dramatists and playwrights